Farkas Gyula de Kisbarnak, or Julius von Farkas de Kisbarnak ( (27 September 1894, in Kismarton/Eisenstadt, Sopron megye – 12 July 1958, in Göttingen) was a Hungarian literary historian and Finno-Ugric linguist.

Biography
He was born into the Roman Catholic Transdanubian Hungarian noble family Farkas de Kisbarnak. His father was Ferenc Farkas de Kisbarnak (1849–1937), captain of the Hungarian Royal army, notary of Kismarton and his mother was Gizella Pottyondy de Potyond und Csáford (1864–1921). His paternal grandfather was Farkas Ferenc de Kisbarnak (1820–1882), administrator of the states of Réde, property of the county Esterházys, and his paternal grandmother was Cecília Hoffmann (1826–1907). His maternal grandparents were dr. Ágoston Pottyondy de Potyond et Csáford, lawyer, and Mária Grohmann (1840-1918). His paternal uncle was Gyula Farkas de Kisbarnak (1847–1930), Hungarian mathematician and physicist. His brother was Ferenc Farkas de Kisbarnak, General of the Hungarian VI Army Corps during World War II.

In the 1920s Gyula was a coworker of Robert Gragger (1887–1926) at the Hungarian Institute of the Friedrich-Wilhelms-Universität in Berlin.  
During World War II he was head of the German-Hungarian Society. 
He founded the Finno-Ugric seminar at the University of Göttingen in 1947.

He wrote over nineteen books dealing with various aspects of Hungarian literature and language, including titles published in German and Hungarian.

Literary works 
 Die Entwicklung der ungarischen Literatur, 1934
 Der ungarische Vormärz Petöfis Zeitalter. 1943 (held in 13 US libraries)
 Geschichte der ungarischen Literaturwissenschaft, 1944

References 

 "The Sign of a Story" review of Petra Török's (ed) 'A határ és a határolt. A magyar irodalom létformáiról [The Boundary and the Bounded Off: Meditations on the Miodes of Being of Hungarian Literature]". Budapest Review of Books, 3 February 1999.  ("a very thorough account of the relations between Gyula Farkas...")

External links 
 

Linguists from Hungary
Hungarian literary historians
Linguists of Indo-European languages
Hungarian Finno-Ugrists
People from Eisenstadt
1894 births
1958 deaths
20th-century linguists